

Group A

El Salvador

Guatemala

Nicaragua

Group B

Belize

Costa Rica

Honduras
Head coach: Luis Paz (BRA)

References

1994 Central American Games
1994 in Central American football
1994